Pizzo Bombögn is a mountain of the Swiss Lepontine Alps, located between Bosco/Gurin and Campo (Vallemaggia) in the canton of Ticino. It lies on the chain east of Pizzo Quadro.

References

External links
 Pizzo Bombögn on Hikr

Mountains of the Alps
Mountains of Ticino
Lepontine Alps
Mountains of Switzerland